"Dolores" is a song written by Louis Alter and Frank Loesser for the 1941 film Las Vegas Nights and recorded by Frank Sinatra with the Tommy Dorsey Band.

The Dorsey / Sinatra version topped the Billboard charts in 1941 closely followed by Bing Crosby's version with The Merry Macs which reached the No. 2 spot during a 15-week stay in the charts.

References

Sources

1941 songs
1941 singles
Bing Crosby songs
Frank Sinatra songs
Songs with music by Louis Alter
Songs written by Frank Loesser
Songs written for films